Orthocomotis ochracea is a species of moth of the family Tortricidae. It is found from Guatemala and Costa Rica to Ecuador and Venezuela.

References

Moths described in 1956
Orthocomotis